Al-Najah Secondary School it is a High School in Al-Baloua neighborhood, Al-Bireh city in Palestine. Founded in 1995.

References

External links
School website

High schools in the State of Palestine

1995 establishments in the Palestinian territories
Al-Bireh